The black-banded sea snake (Hydrophis melanosoma) is a marine snake native to waters around Malaysia, Borneo, Sumatra and Sulawesi.

References

Hydrophis
Reptiles described in 1864
Taxa named by Albert Günther